The Hits is a compilation by Ace of Base that was released in South Africa in late 2004.

Track listing
 "Cruel Summer"
 "All That She Wants"
 "The Sign"
 "C'est La Vie (Always 21)"
 "Living In Danger"
 "Everytime It Rains"
 "Always Have Always Will"
 "Wonderful Life"
 "Don't Turn Around"
 "Unspeakable"
 "Lucky Love"
 "Life Is A Flower"
 "Love In December"
 "Happy Nation"
 "Beautiful Morning"
 "Wheel Of Fortune"
 "Never Gonna Say I'm Sorry"
 "Beautiful Life"
 "Hallo Hallo"
 "Beautiful Morning"
 "Unspeakable"

Ace of Base compilation albums
2004 compilation albums